East Adams is an unorganized territory in Adams County, North Dakota, United States. As of the 2010 census it had a population of 161.
East Adams comprises the territory of the former townships of Cedar Butte, Dakota, Kansas City, Spring Butte, and North Lemmon.

References

Populated places in Adams County, North Dakota